Demchok, was described by a British boundary commission in 1847 as a village lying on the border between the Kingdom of Ladakh and the Tibet. It was a "hamlet of half a dozen huts and tents", divided into two parts by a rivulet which formed the boundary between the two states. The rivulet, a tributary of the Indus River variously called the Demchok River, Charding Nullah, or the Lhari stream, was set as the boundary between Ladakh and Tibet in the 1684 Treaty of Tingmosgang. By 1904–05, the Tibetan side of the hamlet was said to have had 8 to 9 huts of zamindars (landholders), while the Ladakhi side had two. The area of the former Demchok now straddles the Line of Actual Control, the effective border of the People's Republic of China's Tibet Autonomous Region and the Republic of India's Ladakh Union Territory.

Name 
The village of Demchok was apparently named after Demchok Karpo, the rocky white peak behind the present Ladakhi village of Demchok. However, prior to 1947, the main Demchok village was on the Tibetan side of the border. The Ladakhi side of the settlement was still referred to as "Demchok".

Chinese officials use the name "Demchok" only for the Tibetan side of the settlement and refer to the Ladakhi side as "Parigas" (also spelt "Barrigas").

History 

Demchok is a historic area of Ladakh, having been part of the kingdom from its inception in the 10th century. The description of the kingdom in the Ladakh Chronicles mentions Demchok Karpo, also called Demchok Lhari Karpo or Lhari Karpo, as being part of the original kingdom. This is a possible reference to the rocky white peak behind the Ladakhi side of the Demchok village.

The Lhari peak is held sacred by Buddhists. Demchok is the name of a Buddhist Tantric deity, who is believed to reside on the Mount Kailas, and whose imagery parallels that of Shiva in Hinduism.
The Lhari peak is also referred to as "Chota Kailas" (mini Kailas) and attracts pilgrimage from Hindus as well as Buddhists.
Tibetologist Nirmal C. Sinha states that Demchok is part of the Hemis complex.
Ruined houses belonging to the Hemis monastery were noticed by Sven Hedin in 1907, and the monastery continues to own land in Demchok.

17th century

The Chronicles of Ladakh mention that, at the conclusion of the Tibet–Ladakh–Mughal War in 1684, the Prime Minister Desi Sangye Gyatso of Ganden Phodrang Tibet and the King of Ladakh Delek Namgyal agreed on the Treaty of Tingmosgang. The chronicles describe the treaty as fixing the boundary at "the Lhari stream at Demchok".

According to Alexander Cunningham, "A large stone was then set up as a permanent boundary between the two countries, the line of demarcation drawn from the village of Dechhog [Demchok] to the hill of Karbonas."

British colonial era

British boundary commissioner Henry Strachey visited Demchok in 1847 on the borders of the former princely state of Jammu and Kashmir. He described the village as:

The boundary commission determined that the border between the Kashmir and Tibet was at Demchok.

The Survey of Kashmir, Ladak, and Baltistan or Little Tibet of 1847 to 1868 under the Great Trigonometrical Survey of India then made several adjustments to the boundary, described by Alastair Lamb as moving "sixteen miles downstream on the Indus from Demchok". However, Indian commentators state that the revenue records from the period of the survey show that the Demchok area was administered by Ladakh.

In 1904–05, a tour report by the Wazir Wazarat (Governor) of Ladakh described the Tibetan side of the hamlet to have 8 to 9 huts of zamindars (landholders) and described the Ladakhi side as having two. When Sven Hedin visited the area in the November 1907, he described Demchok as four or five huts lying on the southeastern bank of the Lhari stream in Tibet, with the Ladakhi side of the Lhari stream only containing the pyramidal Lhari peak and the ruins of two or three houses.

Modern era

Chinese-administered village

The Chinese-administered village of Dêmqog lies on the southeast bank of the Charding Nullah and LAC. Before 1984, only 3 households were living in Dêmqog. Since 1984, the local governments have encouraged people to move to Dêmqog from surrounding areas. Dêmqog was officially established as an administrative village in 1990 and had a population of 171 people from 51 households in 2019.

Indian-administered village

The Indian-administered village of Demchok lies on the north-west bank of the Charding Nullah and LAC. According to the 2011 Census of India, the village had a population of 78 people from 31 households. In 2019, the village had a population of 69 people.

See also 
 India-China Border Roads 
 List of disputed territories of India
 List of towns and villages in Tibet
 Sino-Indian border dispute

Notes

References

Bibliography 

 
 Indian Report: ; ; ; 
 Chinese report: ; ; ;

External links 
 Demchok Western Sector (Chinese claim), OpenStreetMap
 Demchok Eastern Sector (Indian claim), OpenStreetMap

Divided cities
History of Ladakh
History of Tibet